Dr. John G. & Nannie H. Barrett Farm, also known as Ox-Ford Farm, is a historic home and farm located near Weaverville, Buncombe County, North Carolina.  The farmhouse was built about 1895, and is a vernacular, 1 1/2-story, single-pile frame dwelling. Also on the property are the contributing Lower (Old) Barn (c. 1895), Springhouse (c. 1895), Garage (c. 1935, 1980s), outhouse, and the surrounding farmlands and woodlands.

It was listed on the National Register of Historic Places in 2013.

References

External links
Ox-Ford Farm website

Farms on the National Register of Historic Places in North Carolina
Houses completed in 1895
Houses in Buncombe County, North Carolina
National Register of Historic Places in Buncombe County, North Carolina